Lloyd Raymond Cardwell (April 19, 1913 – November 10, 1997) was an American football player and coach. He played college football for the Nebraska Cornhuskers and professionally in the National Football League (NFL) with the Detroit Lions for seven seasons. After his playing days, Cardwell was the head football coach at Omaha University—now known as the University of Nebraska Omaha from 1947 to 1959, compiling a record of 57–51. His 1954 team was undefeated and won the Tangerine Bowl. Cardwell also coached track and field at Omaha.

Head coaching record

Football

References

External links
 
 

1913 births
1997 deaths
American football ends
American football halfbacks
Detroit Lions players
Nebraska Cornhuskers football players
Nebraska Cornhuskers men's track and field athletes
Nebraska–Omaha Mavericks football coaches
Omaha Mavericks track and field coaches
People from Republic County, Kansas
People from Seward County, Nebraska
Coaches of American football from Nebraska
Players of American football from Nebraska
Track and field athletes from Nebraska